A fracture is the (local) separation of a body into two, or more, pieces under the action of stress.

Fracture may also refer to:

 Bone fracture, a medical condition in which a bone is cracked or broken
 Microfracture surgery surgical repair technique
 Fracture (geology), a fracture within a geological formation
 Fracture (mineralogy), a term in mineralogy describing the shape and texture of broken surfaces
 Fracture (company), an Internet-based photo finishing service
 Fracture toughness, material property measuring the resistance to fracture
 Fracture mechanics, predicting the propagation of cracks
 Fractography, the study of the fracture surfaces of materials

Entertainment
 Fractures (Killing the Dream album), 2008
 Fractures (Sons of Korah album)
 Fracture (Roller Trio album), 2014
 Fracture (Bleed from Within album), 2020
 Fracture (2004 film), a New Zealand film directed by Larry Parr
 Fracture (2007 film), an American film starring Anthony Hopkins and Ryan Gosling
 "Fracture" (Fringe), a season 2 episode of the television series Fringe
 Fracture (Transformers), a fictional character
 Fracture (video game), a third-person shooter video game
 Fractures: Family Stories, a book by Budge Wilson
 "Fracture" (song), a song by Slumberjack
 "Fracture", a song by King Crimson from the album Starless and Bible Black
 "Fractures", a song by Parkway Drive from the album Ire

See also
 Fraction (disambiguation)
 Fractured (disambiguation)
 Fragment (disambiguation)
 Fraktur (disambiguation)
 Shatter (disambiguation)